Jil Sander, S.p.A. is a luxury fashion house founded in 1968 in Hamburg, Germany and currently headquartered in Milan, Italy. Founded by Jil Sander, the brand is best known for its minimalist and clean designs. The brand was acquired by Prada in 1999 and Sander subsequently departed her eponymous label due to creative differences. After several changes of ownership, the Jil Sander brand was acquired by Italian fashion group OTB in March 2021. Luke and Lucie Meier were named co-creative directors of Jil Sander in 2017, succeeding Rodolfo Paglialunga. In 2017 Ubaldo Minelli, CEO of OTB Group, was appointed CEO of the brand.

History

Beginnings
Founded by Jil Sander in 1968, the company's first womenswear collection was launched in 1973, menswear followed in 1997. From 1974 she sold her own collections alongside fashion by Sonia Rykiel, Thierry Mugler and others. The first fragrance – Woman Pure – was launched in 1979. During those years, all of the brand's boutiques were designed by New York architect Michael Gabellini.

In the 1980s Sander presented her collections at the Milan fashion shows. With fashion alone, the company made a turnover of 20 million marks in 1981. The first men's perfume, Jil Sander Man Pure, was launched in 1981.

The company went public and was listed on the Frankfurt stock exchange in 1989; in the process, Sander herself sold a one-third ownership for $56 million while retaining control over the voting shares.

Flagship stores were built in Tokyo, Hong Kong and Taipei, and Sander worked on the design in collaboration with Gabellini and other architects. In 1993 a flagship store was added on Avenue Montaigne in Paris. The 1990s are considered to be the heyday of the Jil Sander brand.

In 1992, the designer Roberto Menichetti was hired as Sander's assistant for the women's collection. The footwear collaboration between Jil Sander and Puma from 1996 onwards goes back to his and Sanders' designs – the designer sneaker King was first presented in 1996, the Easy Rider model followed in 1997. In 1997, Jil Sander launched the men's fashion collection; Menichetti also contributed to these designs. Men's fashion soon contributed around 20 percent to group sales.

Prada, 1999–2006
In 1999, Prada Group bought a 75% share in the company, for which it reportedly paid more than $100 million. At the time, Sander said publicly that she partnered with Prada in large part to expand her brand's accessories business. Six months later, Sander departed the company and nearly all the design and production staff left as well. The company, which had been profitable before the sale to Prada, lost money in 2001 and 2002. Sander returned briefly in 2003, only to leave again 18 months later.

A restructuring that began in 2004 led Prada to predict that the Jil Sander brand would break even by 2006. The brand's only German production site in Ellerau was closed in 2005. All production has since been taking place in Italy.

In May 2005, it was announced that Raf Simons had become creative director for the women's and men's collection. Simons wanted to "strip it down so there was nothing that wasn't necessary". Suzy Menkes, the principal fashion writer for the International Herald Tribune, said that some items in the collection "made exceptional pieces" but overall it "was not as strong as before." The Fall/Winter collection, however, received accolades from IHT. Simons' first women’s collection was shown at Milan Fashion Week in 2006. The collection received a positive review from the Evening Standard and the Los Angeles Times.

Change Capital, 2006–2009
In 2006, Luc Vandevelde's London-based private equity firm Change Capital Partners LLP bought the company from Prada for an undisclosed sum thought to be about £68 million. It also gave equity in the company to Simons, along with two top managers. At that point, the Telegraph reported that the company was in better shape financially. Prada CEO Patrizio Bertelli said: "As we focus on the development of the Prada and Miu Miu brands, I am certain that Change Capital Partners will be able to provide the necessary investment to further grow the Jil Sander business." Raf Simons remained creative director at Jil Sander.

Onward Holdings, 2008–2021
In September 2008, Onward Holdings Co. Ltd., a Japanese multi-brand fashion conglomerate, and its European subsidiary GIBO' CO. S.p.A. acquired unlisted Violine S.à r.l., a Luxembourg-based holding firm that had the Jil Sander brand under its wing, for 167 million euros (US$244 million). Also in 2008, the company entered into licensing agreements with Marchon Eyewear to produce and distribute men’s and women’s eyewear and with Albisetti to produce innerwear and beachwear.

OTB Group, 2021–present
In March 2021, OTB Group acquired 100 percent of the Jil Sander brand.

Designers
 Jil Sander: 1968–2000, 2003–2004, 2012–2013
 Milan Vukmirovic: 2000–2003
 Raf Simons: 2005–2012
 Pauric Sweeney: 2005–2012
 Rodolfo Paglialunga: 2014–2017
 Lucie Meier and Luke Meier: 2017–present

Locations
As of August 2022, Jil Sander operates 42 stores in Europe, Asia, and North America, including in London, Frankfurt, Milan, Paris, Zurich, Tokyo, Seoul, Shanghai, and New York City.

Other projects
As part of Birkenstock's 1774 project, a collaborative collection that saw designs created by Valentino, Proenza Schouler and Rick Owens, Jil Sander teamed up with the footwear brand in 2022 on four shoe designs.

Also in 2022, Jil Sander and LG Electronics launched the fashion brand's first-ever mobile phone.

Recognition
 2011 – Design Museum's Brit Insurance Design Award

See also
 Jil Sander
 Raf Simons
 Prada
 OTB Group

References

External links
 
 Official website

High fashion brands
Luxury brands
Clothing brands of Germany
Clothing brands of Italy
Clothing companies established in 1968
1968 establishments in Germany
German companies established in 1968
Companies based in Hamburg
Companies based in Milan
Manufacturing companies based in Milan
Shoe companies of Italy
Shoe companies of Germany
Bags (fashion)
Companies listed on the Hong Kong Stock Exchange
Design companies established in 1968